Picris (oxtongues) is a genus of flowering plants in the family Asteraceae described as a genus by Linnaeus in 1753.

Picris species are used as food plants by the larvae of some Lepidoptera species, such as the grass moth Diasemia reticularis. Schinia cardui feeds exclusively on P. hieracioides.

The genus is widespread across Europe, Asia, Africa, and Australia.

Description

Erect annual to perennial taprooted herbs, mostly branching, stem and leaves bearing stiff bristly hairs, with rather large, usually corymbose or paniculate heads of yellow flowers.

Taxonomy

Taxonomic history

The genus Picris was first validly described by Linnaeus in 1753 with the genus being accepted by a number of secondary sources including Plants of the World Online. Linnaeus initially described four species with P. hieracioides, P. echioides, P. pyrenaica and P. asplenioides. In 1913, Britton and Brown proposed P. asplenioides as the type species for the genus. Subsequently, in 1930, Hitchcock and Green alternatively proposed P. hieracioides as the type species.  The Hitchcock and Green proposal was adopted by Lack in 1975 and accepted by Jarvis in 1992.  Lack argued that Linnaeus never saw P. asplenioides which Linnaeus regarded as an obscure species and no specimen could be found in the Linnean Herbarium. For this reason Lack concluded that P. hieracioides should be designated as the type species.

In 1794, the German botanist Conrad Moench described the genus Medicusia and the species M. aspera.  This genus has not been accepted and is considered a synonym of Picris. M. aspera has also been determined to be a synonym of P. rhagadioloides.

Etymology

Picris is from the Greek  meaning 'bitter', in reference to the bitter taste of some species in the genus.

Species
 Species

References

Bibliography

Cichorieae
Asteraceae genera
Taxa named by Carl Linnaeus